The eleventh and final season of Modern Family premiered on September 25, 2019 on ABC and concluded on April 8, 2020. The season was produced by 20th Century Fox Television, Steven Levitan Productions, and Picador Productions, with creators Steven Levitan and Christopher Lloyd as showrunners.

Cast

Main
 Ed O'Neill as Jay Pritchett
 Sofía Vergara as Gloria Pritchett
 Julie Bowen as Claire Dunphy
 Ty Burrell as Phil Dunphy
 Jesse Tyler Ferguson as Mitchell Pritchett
 Eric Stonestreet as Cameron Tucker
 Sarah Hyland as Haley Dunphy
 Ariel Winter as Alex Dunphy
 Nolan Gould as Luke Dunphy
 Rico Rodriguez as Manny Delgado
 Aubrey Anderson-Emmons as Lily Tucker-Pritchett
 Jeremy Maguire as Joe Pritchett
 Reid Ewing as Dylan Marshall

Recurring
 Marsha Kramer as Margaret

Notable guests

 Hillary Anne Matthews as Sherry Shaker
 Kristen Li as Suzie
 Tara Strong as Bridget the Smart Fridge (Voice)
 Gabrielle Ruiz as Anne
 Amy Pietz as Janice
 Molly Ephraim as Libby
 Stephanie Beatriz as Sonia Ramirez
 Stephanie Koenig as Sheryl
 Christopher Gorham as Brad
 Matthew Wilkas as Paul
 Dominic Burgess as Nate
 Rob Riggle as Gil Thorpe
 Kevin Daniels as Longines
 Sam Lloyd as Bobby
 Daniela Bobadilla as Trish
 Jimmy Tatro as Bill
 Andy Walken as Deadpool
 Alex Perez as Waiter 
 Mather Zickel as Scooter
 Rory O'Malley as Ptolemy
 Ed Begley Jr. as Jerry
 Rachel Bay Jones as Farrah Marshall
 Lauren Adams as Campbell
 Jen Kirkman as Molly
 Courteney Cox as herself
 David Beckham as himself
 Stephen Merchant as Higgins
 Snoop Dogg as himself (voice)
 Mark Saul as Mantel
 Michelle Campbell as aerobic woman 
 Fred Willard as Frank Dunphy
 Paula Marshall as Beverly
 Hayley Erin as Brenda Feldman
 Melissa Greenspan as Debra
 Benjamin Bratt as Javier Delgado
 Josh Gad as Kenneth
 Paul Dooley as Murray
 Edward Asner as Herschel
 Arnaud Binard as Guy
 Morgan Murphy as Waitress
 Chris Geere as Arvin Fennerman
 Wendie Malick as Miss Beckman
 Jon Daly as Doug
 Tom Fitzpatrick as Jim
 Elizabeth Banks as Sal
 Rusty Gatenby as Jim Alvarez

Episodes

Special
A retrospective special entitled A Modern Farewell aired on Wednesday, April 8, 2020 at 8:00 P.M., prior to the series finale. The retrospective included appearances by Ed O'Neill, Sofia Vergara, Ty Burrell, Julie Bowen, Jesse Tyler Ferguson, Eric Stonestreet, Sarah Hyland, Ariel Winter, Nolan Gould, Rico Rodriguez, Aubrey Anderson-Emmons, Jeremy Maguire, Reid Ewing and Benjamin Bratt.

Ratings

References

External links
 

2019 American television seasons
2020 American television seasons
11